Marguerite d'Youville, SGM (October 15, 1701 – December 23, 1771) was a French Canadian Catholic widow who founded the Order of Sisters of Charity of Montreal, commonly known as the Grey Nuns. She was canonized by Pope John Paul II in 1990, becoming the first native-born Canadian to be declared a saint.

Early life and marriage

She was born Marie-Marguerite Dufrost de Lajemmerais in 1701 at Varennes, Quebec, oldest daughter of Christophe du Frost, Sieur de la Gesmerays (1661–1708) and Marie-Renée Gaultier de Varennes. (According to Quebec naming conventions, she would have always been known as Marguerite, not Marie.) Her father died when she was a young girl. Despite her family's poverty, at age 11 she was able to attend the Ursuline convent in Quebec City for two years before returning home to teach her younger brothers and sisters. Marguerite's impending marriage to a scion of Varennes society was foiled by her mother's marriage below her class to Timothy Sullivan, an Irish doctor who was seen by the townspeople as a disreputable foreigner. On August 12, 1722, at Notre-Dame Basilica in Montreal, she married François d'Youville, a bootlegger who sold liquor illegally to Indigenous Peoples in exchange for furs and who frequently left home for long periods for parts unknown. Despite this, the couple eventually had six children before François died in 1730. By age 30 she had suffered the loss of her father, husband and four of her six children, who died in infancy. Marguerite experienced a religious renewal during her marriage. "In all these sufferings Marguerite grew in her belief of God's presence in her life and His tender love for every human person. She, in turn, wanted to make known His compassionate love to all. She undertook many charitable works with complete trust in God, whom she loved as a Father."

Grey Nuns of Montreal

Marguerite and three other women founded in 1737 a religious association to provide a home for the poor in Montreal. At first, the home only housed four or five members, but it grew as the women raised funds. As their actions went against the social conventions of the day, d'Youville and her colleagues were mocked by their friends and relatives and even by the poor they helped. Some called them "les grises", which can mean "the grey women" but which also means "the drunken women", in reference to d'Youville's late husband's career as a bootlegger. By 1744 the association had become a Catholic religious order with a rule and a formal community. In 1747 they were granted a charter to operate the General Hospital of Montreal, which by that time was in ruins and heavily in debt. d'Youville and her fellow workers brought the hospital back into financial security, but the hospital was destroyed by fire in 1765. The order rebuilt the hospital soon after. By this time, the order was commonly known as the "Grey Nuns of Montreal" after the nickname given to the nuns in ridicule years earlier. Years later, as the order expanded to other cities, the order became known simply as the "Grey Nuns".

Slave owner
d'Youville has been described as "one of Montreal's more prominent slaveholders". d'Youville and the Grey Nuns used enslaved laborers in their hospital and purchased and sold both Indian slaves and British prisoners, including an English slave which she purchased from the Indians. The vast majority of the 'slaves' in the hospital were English soldiers and would be better described as prisoners of war. As described in 'The Captors' Narrative: Catholic Women and Their Puritan Men on the Early American Frontier': "These 21 men were not captive freeholders, resentful of their captors' religion and longing to reestablish themselves at home. They were for the most part young soldiers, many of them conscripts, simply wishing to survive their captivity. However strange they may have found the community that held them and the woman who supervised them, they were probably relieved to find themselves in a situation that offered a strong possibility of survival. They knew their fellow soldiers to be dying in nearby prisons -- places notorious for their exposure to the heat and cold and unchecked pestilence. As hard as they must have worked at Pointe-Saint-Charles, the men could easily have regarded their captivity at least as a partial blessing."

Legacy
Marguerite d'Youville died in 1771 at the General Hospital. In 1959, she was beatified by Pope John XXIII, who called her "Mother of Universal Charity", and was canonized in 1990 by Pope John Paul II. She is the first native-born Canadian to be elevated to sainthood by the Roman Catholic Church. Her feast day is October 16. In 1961, a shrine was built in her birthplace of Varennes. Today, it is the site of a permanent exhibit about the life and works of Marguerite. The review process included a medically inexplicable cure of acute myeloid leukemia after relapse. The woman is the only known long-term survivor in the world, having lived more than 40 years from a condition that typically kills people in 18 months.

A large number of Roman Catholic churches, schools, women's shelters, charity shops, and other institutions in Canada and worldwide are named after St. Marguerite d'Youville.  Most notably, the renowned academic institution of higher learning, D'Youville College in Buffalo, NY, is named after her. The D'Youville Academy at Plattsburgh, New York was founded in 1860.

Sir Louis-Amable Jetté’s wife, Lady Jetté, wrote a biography of Marie-Marguerite d'Youville.

Final resting place
In 2010, Mother Marie-Marguerite d'Youville's remains were removed from Grey Nuns Motherhouse and relocated to her birthplace of Varennes.

Recognition
On September 21, 1978, Canada Post issued 'Marguerite d'Youville' based on a design by Antoine Dumas. The 14¢ stamps are perforated 13.5 and were printed by Canadian Bank Note Company, Limited.

See also
 Canadian Roman Catholic saints
 Grey Nuns

Notes

References

External links
Ancestors of Marguerite d'Youville (in French)
 , by an expert who testified comments about one of her miracles

1701 births
1771 deaths
18th-century Christian saints
Canadian Roman Catholic saints
Canadian Roman Catholic religious sisters and nuns
Persons of National Historic Significance (Canada)
People from Varennes, Quebec
Christian female saints of the Early Modern era
Beatifications by Pope John XXIII
Canonizations by Pope John Paul II
Canadian slave owners
Women slave owners